Pomanda Island is an island in the Australian state of South Australia, located in within Lake Alexandrina about  southeast of the Adelaide city centre and   south of the town of Wellington. It was the proposed site of a temporary weir of  length which was intended to protect River Murray water supplies, should it become necessary to let seawater into Lake Alexandrina.

References

Islands of South Australia
River islands of Australia
Islands of the Murray River